National Olympic Committee of Laos (IOC code: LAO) is the National Olympic Committee representing Laos.

External links 
National Olympic Committee of Laos

Laos
Oly
Laos at the Olympics
1975 establishments in Laos

Sports organizations established in 1975